Nodopelta rigneae is a species of sea snail, a marine gastropod mollusk in the family Peltospiridae.

Description
The length of the shell attains 8.7 mm.

Distribution
This marine species was found on the East Pacific Rise.

References

External links
 Warén A. & Bouchet P. (2001). Gastropoda and Monoplacophora from hydrothermal vents and seeps new taxa and records. The Veliger, 44(2): 116-231

Peltospiridae
Gastropods described in 2001